

The Castleton Bridge is a cantilever truss bridge over the Hudson River, connecting Coeymans, Albany County with Schodack, Rensselaer County in New York. It carries the Berkshire Connector of the New York State Thruway. This bridge is also sometimes called the Castleton-on-Hudson Bridge and is situated in close proximity to the Alfred H. Smith Memorial Bridge, which is used by rail traffic.

The Castleton Bridge is located on the longest section of the New York State Thruway that does not have an Interstate Highway designation, between interchanges 21A (Interstate 87) and B1 (Interstate 90). There is a $0.60 toll each way to cross this bridge. It is not collected at a separate toll barrier, but is rather collected as part of the Thruway's ticketed toll system. It costs at least $1.05 to cross ($1.00 with an E-ZPass discount), by traveling between Interchange 22 and Interchange B1 on the Thruway. It is the northernmost road bridge on the Hudson River with a toll and is the only bridge with a toll in both directions (collected as part of the Thruway's existing ticketed toll system); every road bridge south of this has an eastbound-only toll.

History
The bridge was built in the late 1950s, and opened May 26, 1959 to coincide with the opening of the final 6-mile segment of the New York State Thruway's Berkshire Section connecting to the Massachusetts Turnpike.

L-Tech Coatings completed updates as painting contractor for BBL Construction in two seasons in 1985 and 1986.

In May 2007, the bridge carried 14,500 vehicles per day. NYSDOT, FHWA and NYSTA have discussed potential strategies to divert peak hour traffic traveling along Interstate 90 between exit 24 and exit B1 to the Castleton Bridge to reduce traffic volumes on the Patroon Island Bridge in Albany.

See also
List of fixed crossings of the Hudson River

References

External links

Bridges over the Hudson River
Toll bridges in New York (state)
New York State Thruway Authority
Bridges completed in 1959
Road bridges in New York (state)
Cantilever bridges in the United States